Donald Maurice Washington Jr. (born April 22, 1952) is an American former professional basketball player. He played for the Denver Nuggets and Utah Stars in the American Basketball Association before embarking on an international professional career that lasted until 1989.

He played college basketball for the North Carolina Tar Heels. As a sophomore in 1972–73, the first year he was eligible to play for the varsity squad, he averaged over 12 points per game. He broke his foot during the season, and coupled with academic under-performance, Washington decided to pursue his professional career instead of returning to North Carolina for his junior year. He played a season in Switzerland before returning to the United States to play in the ABA for the Denver Nuggets and Utah Stars.

References

1957 births
Living people
American expatriate basketball people in France
American expatriate basketball people in the Netherlands
American expatriate basketball people in Switzerland
Basketball players from Washington, D.C.
Denver Nuggets players
New York Knicks draft picks
North Carolina Tar Heels men's basketball players
Parade High School All-Americans (boys' basketball)
Small forwards
Utah Stars players
American men's basketball players

BV RZ players
Dutch Basketball League players